This is a list of the extreme points of the Arctic, the points of Arctic lands that are farther to the north than any other location classified by continent and country, latitude and longitude, and distance to the North Pole. The list is sorted from north to south.

Highest point
Gunnbjørn Fjeld, Sermersooq, Island of Greenland, Greenland  — highest summit at 3694 m (12,119 feet)

Lowest point
Arctic Ocean — lowest surface point at sea level

See also 
Extreme points of Earth
Extreme points of the Antarctic

Notes

References

External links

Extreme points of Earth
Polar regions of the Earth
 
Arctic